The 2022 Lehigh Mountain Hawks football team represented Lehigh University as a member of the Patriot League during the 2022 NCAA Division I FCS football season. The Mountain Hawks, led by fourth-year head coach Tom Gilmore, played their home games at Goodman Stadium. They finished the season 2–9, 2–4 in Patriot League play to finish in a three-way tie for fourth place. Gilmore resigned at the end of the season.

Schedule

References

Lehigh
Lehigh Mountain Hawks football seasons
Lehigh Mountain Hawks football